The 2016 Big South men's basketball tournament was held from March 3-6, 2016, at the Pope Convocation Center in Buies Creek, North Carolina on the campus of Campbell University. UNC Asheville won the tournament and received the Big South's automatic bid to the 2016 NCAA tournament.

Site 
Coastal Carolina was originally scheduled to host the basketball tournament for a fourth consecutive year, but, on August 30, 2015, the school announced that they would be joining the Sun Belt Conference effective July 1, 2016. Big South bylaws state that member schools leaving the conference with less than two years notice are not eligible to host championships.

Seeds
All 11 conference teams were eligible for the tournament. The top five teams received a first round bye. Teams were seeded by record within the conference, with a tiebreaker system to seed teams with identical conference records.

Schedule

Bracket

References

Tournament
Big South Conference men's basketball tournament
Big South Conference men's basketball tournament
Big South Conference men's basketball tournament